For the American fashion model, see Stacey Williams.

Stacey Williams (born November 2, 1981) is a Paralympic swimming competitor from Australia. She was born in Subiaco, Western Australia  and educated at La Salle College. She won a bronze medal at the 2000 Sydney Games in the Women's 100 m Breaststroke SB7 event. She was born on 2 November 1981.

References

Female Paralympic swimmers of Australia
Swimmers at the 2000 Summer Paralympics
Paralympic bronze medalists for Australia
1981 births
Living people
Medalists at the 2000 Summer Paralympics
Paralympic medalists in swimming
Australian female breaststroke swimmers
S7-classified Paralympic swimmers
20th-century Australian women
21st-century Australian women